Antonio José Mota Romero (January 26, 1939 – September 13, 1986) was a Mexican professional football goalkeeper, who played for the Mexico national team between 1961 and 1970. He was part of the Mexico squad for FIFA World Cup tournaments: 1962 and 1970.

At club level, Mota played for CD Oro and Necaxa.

External links
 
 

1939 births
Association football goalkeepers
Mexico international footballers
Footballers from Mexico City
1962 FIFA World Cup players
1970 FIFA World Cup players
Liga MX players
Club Necaxa footballers
1986 deaths
Mexican footballers